Shahedul Alam Shahed is a Bangladeshi footballer who last played as a defensive midfielder for Bangladesh Police FC in the Bangladesh Premier League.

In 2011, Shahed made his international debut for Bangladesh. He has scored one goal in 9 matches so far. As a team player, Shahed has won 2 titles so far, one for Dhaka Abahani and the other one for Sheikh Jamal.

Career statistics

International

International goals
Scores and results list Bangladesh's goal tally first.

Bangladesh

References

External links 
 
 Shahedul Alam Shahed's goal against Maldives on Youtube 

1991 births
Living people
Bangladeshi footballers
Association football midfielders
Abahani Limited (Dhaka) players
Sheikh Jamal Dhanmondi Club players
Feni SC players
Sheikh Russel KC players
Saif SC players
Rahmatganj MFS players
Bangladesh international footballers
Footballers at the 2010 Asian Games
Bangladesh Police FC players
Bangladesh Football Premier League players